Carlos Gabriel Niño (born February 16, 1977) is a Californian music producer, percussionist, performer, arranger, composer, musician, programmer, radio host, DJ, music consultant, poet, and event organizer, based in his hometown of Woodland Hills, California. Niño has been involved in the production of more than 150 records and has toured with various bands and as a DJ throughout Europe, Japan and the United States.

Radio 
Niño started his first radio show All At One Point at KPFK 90.7 FM, Los Angeles in October 1995 after volunteering at the station as a junior reporter and producer from Summer 1994. All At One Point was focused on "Hip-Hop, Soul, Jazz, and World Rhythms." While hosting the show on Wednesdays from 8pm–10pm Pacific, Niño played his favorite contemporary artists and featured live in studio performances and interviews with both established and up and coming artists and bands, and DJs. DJ Organic, Hymnl and Jon Liu all co-hosted the show with him at different times from 1995–1998.

In October 1999, after a 6-month hiatus (following the birth of his son) he returned to KPFK with a new sound and vision: Spaceways Radio. On this program he explored Psychedelic, Electronic, Folk, New Age, and World Musics, and created specials dedicated to individual artists and bands, phases of the Zodiac, and years past. Spaceways Radio aired: Sundays 10pm–Midnight (1999–2003), Fridays 8pm–10pm (2004–2009), and Sundays 10pm–Midnight (2010–2015). The last Spaceways Radio broadcast was Sunday, March 22, 2015.

Niño was the Host and DJ of other music programs on KPFK at the same time that All At One Point and Spaceways aired, including Saturdays and Rise. He is a founding and contributing DJ / producer of Dublab Internet Radio Station. He was a monthly contributor to David Lynch's Transcendental Radio, and Scion Radio, and has made several special mixes for the BBC and Red Bull Music Academy Radio.

Carlos Niño & Friends 
This is the highly collaborative, on-going project that Niño has been most focused on as a recording artist and producer since he started it in 2008. In the 2017 Bandcamp Article by Will Schube, Niño says:
"the '& Friends' concept is really about me doing whatever I want creatively, with whoever I want. Just really freeing it up. These are the people I'm closest with personally. They're literally my closest friends. They're on the record because of that, and because they're among my favorite musicians and people to collaborate with."

Discography

Carlos Niño & Friends 
 High With A Little Help From (Plug Research US / Kindred Spirits EU 2009)
 Aquariusssssss (Porter, 2012)
 Aurorasmushroomtenderness (self-released, 2014)
 Flutes, Echoes, It's All Happening! (Leaving, 2016)
 Going Home (Leaving, 2017)
 Live At The World Stage (Leaving, 2018)
 Bliss On Dear Oneness (Leaving, 2019)
 Actual Presence (self-released via Bandcamp, 2020)
 More Energy Fields, Current (International Anthem, 2021)

With Miguel Atwood-Ferguson
Chicago Waves (International Anthem, 2020) – with Miguel Atwood-Ferguson
Chicago Waves Remixes (International Anthem, 2020) – Four remixes made with music originally composed and recorded by Niño and Atwood-Ferguson for Chicago Waves

Other music projects 
 Ammoncontact – co-founder, producer, artist
 Build An Ark – founder, producer, band leader
 Carlos Niño & Friends – producer, artist
 Raindiance / You're Suspended with Sam Gendel – producer, co-mixer, percussion
 Die Cut by Cut Chemist – associate producer
 Dexter Story
Seasons – co-producer
Wondem – co-producer
Bahir – co-producer
 Horace by Dwight Trible – co-producer
 Gaby Hernandez
 When Love – co-producer, co-composer
 Spirit Reflection – co-producer, co-composer
 Go: Organic Orchestra – co-producer, promoter
 Hu Vibrational – co-Founder, producer
 Black Space Tapes by Jamael Dean – co-producer, co-mixer, percussion
 Jamael Dean & The AfroNauts – percussion
 Bring on the Sun and Sun Gong by Laraaji – co-producer, co-mixer
 The Life Force Trio – founder, co-producer, co-composer
 Love is the Answer by Dwight Trible & the Life Force Trio (2005) – co-producer, co-composer
 Living Room (2006)
 The Masses – composer, DJ
 GEA by Mia Doi Todd – co-producer
 The Miguel Atwood-Ferguson Ensemble – percussion
 Nate Mercereau Sundays – co-producer, musician
 Nate Mercereau & Carlos Niño – co-producer, artist
 Photay with Carlos Niño – co-producer, artist
 The Sound Of L.A. – co-executive producer, project coordinator
 Spaceways Radio Collage – producer, artist
 Spaceways Radio Remix – producer
 Turn On The Sunlight – co-founder, co-producer, artist
 What's The Science? – co-founder, producer, artist

References

External links 
 Carlos Niño Bandcamp
 
 Going Home
 Suite For Ma Dukes
 Build An Ark In Amsterdam

1977 births
Living people
American DJs
Musicians from Los Angeles